Gaetano Thiene (born July 1, 1947) is an Italian Emeritus Professor of Cardiovascular Pathology at the University of Padua. His professional interests include cardiology and pathology.

Education and career 
Thiene received a degree in medicine in 1972, and performed specialized post-graduate work in cardiology and pathology from 1975-1978. His subsequent professional positions included Professor of Pathology, director of Cardiovascular Sciences and the Institute of Pathological Anatomy, vice-dean of the Department of Medico-Diagnostic Sciences and Special Therapies (all at University of Padua), and in 2002 was an Honorary Fellow of the Royal College of Physicians.

During his career Thiene received research grant support from the European Commission, the Italian Ministry of Health, and the Italian Ministry of Education.

Awards and honors 
2008 Andreas Grüntzig Lecture and Award, Swiss Society of Cardiology
2011 Distinguished Achievement Lecture and Award, Society for Cardiovascular Pathology
2013 Paul Dudley White International Lecture and Award, American Heart Association
2014 Rene Laennec Lecture and Award, European Society of Cardiology

References

External links
Prof. Gaetano Thiene - Emeritus Professor - University of Padua - Italy
Professor Gaetano Thiene - Google Scholar 

21st-century Italian scientists
Academic staff of the University of Padua
University of Padua alumni

1947 births
Living people